Extra Credits is a Canadian and American video lesson series currently run by Matthew Krol and Geoffrey Zatkin, narrated by Matthew Krol, with artists Scott DeWitt, Nick DeWitt, David "D" Hueso, and Ali R. Throme and Jordan Martin and writers Robert Rath, R. Kevin Doyle and other staff members. Social Media is run by Kat Rider. The series of videos discusses topics pertinent to video game development and game studies, addressing the legitimacy of video games as art, and creating intellectual discourse on important issues in gaming culture.

The series was developed directly from a series of lecture videos by animator Daniel Floyd, informally known as Video Games And..., which ran sporadically from February 17, 2008, to April 16, 2010, with certain episodes written by James Portnow.

The series originally aired on The Escapist from July 28, 2010, to August 10, 2011, before being split off over a financial dispute. Between September 7, 2011, and December 31, 2013, the show aired on PATV, a distribution channel hosted by Penny Arcade, whose downsizing of partner services after the latter date was cited as the reason for the show's subsequent "move" to YouTube, where the show is currently aired. In addition, the episodes have been syndicated on many websites, including ScrewAttack.

History

2008-2011: Beginnings

The series has its roots in 2008 when co-creator Daniel Floyd created two video presentations for his respective art history and media theory classes at Savannah College of Art and Design. Floyd states that the style of his presentations was "loosely modeled" after Zero Punctuation. The assignment had a time limit of ten minutes, so Floyd sped up his voice by 10% to meet that limit, an effect that continued in subsequent episodes. He put it on YouTube just to see if anyone had interest and to his surprise the videos viewers hits grew very large very quickly. James Portnow had been referenced in these early videos and decided to contact Floyd about the possibility of working together to make more videos. Portnow wanted Dan to continue using his original created format of videos with animated Dan giving lectures at the podium about articles that would be written by Portnow. These were not part of an officially-named series, though this early collection eventually went by "Video Games and...". A blog maintained by creator Floyd for the videos used the secondary title "Talking About These", and certain videos also went by "Game Design Corner". One episode also features journalist Leigh Alexander from Gamasutra in a discussion about video games and their female audience.

In July 2010, an announcement was made that the series would be a featured series for The Escapist, where weekly episodes of the series began, as well as the introduction of the new title, Extra Credits. Since Floyd had started working at Pixar Canada at the time, Portnow also enlisted colleague Allison Theus to handle the art. The first episode, "Bad Writing", debuted on July 28 and would since be on The Escapist for the next year.

In May 2011, The Escapist and the show's creators hosted the Extra Credits Innovation Awards at LOGIN 2011, which was meant to praise developers who were willing to take risks and push the boundaries of video games as a medium. Awards were intentionally nonstandard compared to other awards frequently presented, focusing on ingenuity rather than success, including the categories: Innovation in Game Design, Innovation in Narrative Delivery, Most Unbelievable Awesome Fun, Genre Buster Award, Positive Impact Innovator, and LOGIN Special Award for Innovation in Multiplayer.

2011-2016: Dispute and revival
On June 28, 2011, Portnow announced through the show's Twitter account that Theus had a radial tear in her shoulder (likely a separated shoulder) that could potentially end her career. A two-month crowdfund project on RocketHub was created with a goal of $15,000, which eventually raised around $104,000. The crew, overwhelmed at the response, decided to start an independent game publisher with the excess profits.

Around the end of July, The Escapist privately contacted Portnow with a disputing claim for the funds. Alexander Macris, then-content director for The Escapist, led the claim and stated the money should have been used to create more episodes of Extra Credits and to compensate parent company Themis Media for donation incentives, such as premium memberships and T-shirts. As a result, Extra Credits broke ties with The Escapist, and after a brief four-week stint posting directly to YouTube, the show was picked up by Penny Arcades PATV network.

The indie fund would ultimately be created under Extra Credits LLC, which was started on November 18, 2011, and holds the show's unregistered IP rights. Starting with episode 100, Elisa "LeeLee" Scaldaferri (creator of former Escapist webcomic Name Game) became an official staff artist for the show, to rotate episode productions with Theus. Later, Theus departed from the series to work full-time at Retro Studios (though she still contributes to spin-off mini-series) and was replaced by webcomic artist Scott DeWitt.

In December 2013, Penny Arcade announced the downsizing of its services, including the detachment of Extra Credits and other partner shows from PATV. The crew announced that their official YouTube channel, which was previously intended to be an outlet for syndication, would become the official release outlet starting at the beginning of 2014. The first videos officially released since then were a previously broadcast live Q&A video and the episode "The Good We Do".

2017-present: New team and departures
On 2017 the show's Twitch channel was relaunched, with nightly hosts including Echo Diaz and Will Overgard.

On May 23, 2018, in the episode "Choice Paralysis - Too Much Of A Good Thing", Daniel Floyd announced that he and Carrie would be leaving Extra Credits, and that Matt Krol would take over as new narrator and showrunner. Krol was a television producer and podcast host who frequently guest hosts with Portnow on the show's Twitch channel. A series of Extra History and a spinoff called Extra Politics were completed ahead of the announcement and aired throughout June of that year.

On October 30, 2019, however, in the episode "The Perfect Horror Protagonist - Writing a Character for Fun & Terror", Krol mentioned that James Portnow, the only member of the original lineup, was leaving Extra Credits after 10 years of being the show's writer, even though his scripts would be used for future episodes.

Members

Controversy
Will Overgard was laid off after he "violated [Extra Credits'] community code of conduct", something that was privately reported. The exact nature of this violation is disputed. Will Overgard stated "I had screwed up badly in my personal life and even privately offered to resign over it. But that offer was never acknowledged. My "community guidelines" violations were never discussed."

On June 9, 2018, former media director Soraya Een Hajji went public on Twitter about leaving the show due to growing tensions with Portnow after their romantic relationship had ended. Extra Credits responded with a statement on their website in which they confirmed there had been a complaint but stated that an independent investigation "found no evidence of improprieties with regards to the claims of workplace harassment."

Soraya later admitted that James had never harassed or abused her, claiming that her statements had been "misinterpreted" and that she made them as a reaction to going through "a difficult breakup".

Format
The show is presented in the style of a lecture hall, and addresses the topic of the week with illustrations and random imagery from various sources on the internet, with a strong focus on visual puns. The tone is generally light-hearted and often humorous, but always didactic, intended to educate the audience and encourage discussions on the presented subject. Generally, the show's topics target the perspective of a game designer rather than average gamers.

The opening song, "Penguin Cap" by CarboHydroM, is a cover of the "Slide" music cue from Super Mario 64. Ending songs vary between episodes, but are typically sourced from OverClocked ReMix, where Floyd was a former contributor. Notably, Floyd hinted occasionally about another arrangement from CarboHydroM that he wanted to use as his departing outro song, which was revealed to be a cover of the end credits music from Super Mario Kart called "Secret 1000cc Mode" on his final Extra Credits episode in May 2018.

Extra Credits for most of its history was produced and narrated by Floyd, who used pitch-shifting to create a unique, high-pitched voice. Portnow is credited for writing episode scripts, which are refined by Floyd or Krol for recording. Floyd was also responsible for editing videos, but later assigned these duties to his wife, Carrie. Original art was drawn by Theus in the first years of the show, but episodes were split between Scaldaferri and DeWitt. Since October 2014, episodes have been split between Dan Jones and DeWitt. Occasionally, guest artists have been invited during production droughts and spin-off series, most notably webcomic artist Erin Siegel, who had made repeated appearances.

While Extra Credits discusses new topics every week as they apply to video games, there are some topics which are more frequently addressed than others, including: poor narrative creation, level design, gamification, tangential learning, sexuality and gender discrimination both within games and in the gaming community, and diversity in games (including gender, sexuality, and racial diversity). The show is also frequently critical of the triple-A video game industry. Extra Credits is also a big proponent of independent developers, although it has been frequently stated that they don't want to see only "art house" games either. "No one on this show wants every game to try to be gaming's Ulysses or even gaming's Blood Meridian. But we really would like to see a few more Mass Effects, Portals, BioShocks, even Call of Duty 4s."

Business operations have been handled by Kate Donaldson until the end of 2013, and have been handled from then until 2018 by Soraya Een Hajji, who is also a volunteer director for GaymerX. Een Hajji also began writing Extra History in 2017 to assist Portnow in scheduling.

Community
July 1, 2011 marked the creation of a fan-operated community surrounding Extra Credits with a Steam group indirectly started in response to Theus' injury, and which was supported by Portnow. Group chat sessions ultimately led to the creation of a web forum, Extra Curricular, during the night of the 15th. The forum was publicly acknowledged by Portnow on July 21 and August 25, and was re-launched on a new official domain for the show around January 10, 2012. Meant for PAX East 2012, a tribute video to Extra Credits was also made featuring some fans and colleagues of the crew. This was the basis for an independent testimonial program.

After Extra Credits had established its home on YouTube, on January 12, 2016, plans were announced to shut down the official website, including the Extra Curricular forum. The forum was independently spun off as Bonus Points, while a semi-official Discord server was established to fill the community gap and a new official website was launched in late 2017.

On August 6, 2018 Extra Credits announced their first game jam hosted on itch.io, running from August 16 - August 18. The jam hosted 1,158 participants, and finished with 328 entries, a little over 28% participation (an average game jam has approximately 25% participation). In a blog post following the jam, Extra Credits indicated they would like to host more events like the jam and "By hosting more opportunities in the future for people to creatively collaborate, we hope that more people are enabled to make cooler things--because learning matters."

Starting February 2021, Extra Credits started posting their videos ad-free on Nebula Streaming Service as part of the Standard Creator Community, with some exclusive and extended cut videos on the service.

Serials

Since partnering with PATV, all official episodes have been re-categorized into seasons of 26 each for technical constraints on their site. The only videos to not follow this format are the pre-Escapist videos, which are exclusively held by Floyd but have each been eventually replaced by updated official episodes.

Mini-series and spin-offs
During the show's run, the creators have been occasionally requested to create game-specific mini-series based on Extra Credits. The first one was Extra Credits: Firefall, which spanned 5 episodes and was requested by Red 5 Studios to help reinforce the game design decisions in their video game Firefall.

After moving to YouTube, the team decided to make use of their space to expand their channel with new series running on different days of the week. First announced on March 24, 2013, and debuted 4 days later, James Recommends is an extension of previous "Games You Might Not Have Tried" episodes of the main series, and features Portnow discussing the merits of less-popular games which he finds unique. The following week, Floyd announced Extra Remix, which features spotlights on promising members of the video game music community, namely through OverClocked ReMix. Portnow also brought in colleague Dan Emmons to run Design Club, a series supplemented by live streams in which Emmons discusses the merits of design as they pertain to specific games or levels. Extra Frames is a series of videos produced by Floyd in which he discusses video game animation, which has since rebranded to New Frames Plus(see PlayFrame below). A new series began in late 2017 titled Extra Sci-Fi, which examines works of science-fiction and their cultural impact. Another spin-off, titled Extra Mythology, began in early 2018, examining myths from different early religions.

On June 4, 2018, Extra Credits launched an 8-episode mini-series named Extra Politics that exploring the United States political system from a game design perspective.

Extra HistoryExtra History is a spin-off on the main channel focused on topics in history. It started out as a mini-series requested by Creative Assembly to deal with the Punic Wars, in which their video game Total War: Rome II was set.

On August 23, 2014, the crew announced a campaign through Patreon to fund the continuation of Extra History full-time. This campaign gained over $2,500 within a 24-hour period, and  lists over $15,000 in monthly pledges. Topics are chosen by a monthly poll seeded with suggestions made by Patreon supporters. The show has its own dedicated staff, including art by David Hueso, Lilienne Chan, and Nick DeWitt, and music by Dean and Sean Kiner.

Twitch channel
The show's official Twitch channel was launched in 2013 as a live supplement on certain weekdays. It originally ran with Design Club Live and Allison's Art Corner, hosted by Dan Emmons and Allison Theus respectively. Emmons departed within a few years, and the channel went dormant.

It was relaunched in 2017 with the hiring of professional streamer Will Overgard to be production lead for the channel. Overgard frequently streamed video games on the channel until his removal in April 2018. Various gameplay and discussion streams have since been aired by Echo Diaz, David Hueso, James Portnow, and Matt Krol.

PlayFrame
Extra Credits launched a sister channel called Extra Play on December 14, 2014, but it did not become active until October 2015, when Side Quest, a Let's Play series of Dark Souls with Floyd and Portnow, was moved from the main channel to Extra Play. The purpose of this channel is to provide a place for the team to post more casual, less-scripted videos that wouldn't fit on Extra Credits. Besides Side Quest, the channel runs several other let's play series. In Guest Play, Floyd brings in people who also work in the gaming industry to discuss design elements in video games, which often features other members of the Extra Credits team. Floyd also started an unnamed series of videos discussing animation in video games, which has since been named Extra Frames and moved to Extra Credits on May 5, 2016. Portnow has started Destiny Whaaat? and Tea & Hearthstone. He discusses questionable design choices in Destiny in the former and analyzes aspects of Hearthstone in the latter. Dan Jones, one of the artists of Extra Credits has started a Pokémon Nuzlocke Challenge of Pokémon Diamond.

Since leaving Extra Credits, Floyd took personal ownership of the channel (as well as Extra Frames series, see Mini-series and spin-offs above) and renamed it PlayFrame''''', with new content based on "Let's Play"-style videos with regular contributions by Carrie Floyd and Dan Jones.

References

External links

 Official site

2008 web series debuts
American non-fiction web series
Internet properties established in 2010
2010 web series debuts
Online edutainment
Gaming-related YouTube channels
Video game critics